The Black Sea tadpole-goby (Benthophilus nudus) is a species of goby native to the basin of the Black Sea. Found in the Gulf of Tendra and limans of the north-western Black Sea, lakes of the Danube Delta. In the rivers of the Black Sea basin: Danube up to Iron Gate dam, Dniester up to  Tighina, Dnieper up to Kyiv, Southern Bug.  This species is mostly a denizen of fresh and slightly brackish bodies of water, preferring rivers and deltas, limans and coastal lakes.  This fish can reach a length of  TL.

References

Benthophilus
Fish of the Black Sea
Fish of Europe
Fish described in 1898